Porbandar Bird Sanctuary is situated in the Porbandar District of Gujarat state, India.

It is the only sanctuary in India, which lies in the heart of city of Porbandar and is a unique example of co-existence of man and nature.
It is the only bird sanctuary of the Gujarat that provides legal protection to varied species of birds which nest here. Porbandar Bird Sanctuary is the smallest bird sanctuary spread over in an area of 1 square km. The sanctuary has a lake attracting migratory birds and other birds such as teals, fowls, flamingos, ibis and curlews

See also 
 Arid Forest Research Institute caters for the forestry research needs of the Arid and semi arid region of Rajasthan, Gujarat & Dadra and Nagar Haveli & Daman-Diu.

References

Bird sanctuaries of Gujarat
Porbandar district
Protected areas with year of establishment missing